Dickerson Potato House is a historic potato house located near Delmar, Sussex County, Delaware. It one of the last surviving examples of its building type.  It was built about 1900, and is a two-story, gable fronted, balloon frame structure on a brick foundation. It measures 30 feet 4 inches by 23 feet 3 inches. It retains a number of important elements characteristic of potato house including: multiple sheathing, gable end orientation, interior chimney, and closely fitting window hatches.

It was placed on the National Register of Historic Places in 1990.

References

Agricultural buildings and structures on the National Register of Historic Places in Delaware
Commercial buildings completed in 1900
Buildings and structures in Sussex County, Delaware
Potato houses in Delaware
National Register of Historic Places in Sussex County, Delaware